Babilônia (Babylon Hill; International title: Ambitious Women) is a Brazillan primetime telenovela produced and broadcast by TV Globo. It premiered on March 16, 2015, replacing Império at  9:10 p.m. / 10:25 p.m. (BRT/AMT).

Written by Gilberto Braga, Ricardo Linhares and João Ximenes Braga, with collaboration of Ângela Carneiro, Chico Soares, Fernando Rebello, João Brandão, Luciana Pessanha, Maria Camargo and Sérgio Marques; and directed by Cristiano Marques, Pedro Peregrino, Luisa Lima, Giovanna Machline, Maria de Médicis and Dennis Carvalho.

Features performances of Camila Pitanga, Thiago Fragoso, Gabriel Braga Nunes, Marcos Palmeira, Fernanda Montenegro, Nathalia Timberg, Cássio Gabus Mendes, Arlete Salles, Tainá Müller, Thiago Martins, Bruno Gissoni, Chay Suede, Sophie Charlotte, Bruno Gagliasso, Adriana Esteves and Glória Pires in the main roles.

With a history considered "bold" by critics, addressing bold themes for the genre, such as homosexuality and racism, has been rejected by the majority of the public. To date, is the smaller audience of a 9PM telenovela in all time, with an average of 27.7 points in the first 10 episodes.

Plot 
Once childhood friends, Beatriz (Glória Pires) and Inês (Adriana Esteves) eventually become arch-enemies due to Inês' envy for Beatriz's sudden enrichment. Beatriz married into money to businessman Evandro (Cassio Gabus Mendes) and raised playboy Gustavo (Bruno Gissoni), she gets involved with Cristóvão (Val Perré) and ends up being blackmailed with pictures by Inês. She ends up killing him and framing Inês so that she goes to prison instead of her. After being released, Inês end up in Dubai, United Arab Emirates, along with her husband Homero (Tuca Andrada) and her daughter Alice (Sophie Charlotte).

Cast

Ratings

In his debut, Babilônia has acquired an Ibope Rating of 31 points in the preliminary numbers, representing the worst debut of a 9PM telenovela in all time. However, in the final numbers, this index increased two points, and the debut recorded 33 points, with 50% share. At the same time, Carrossel (SBT - 8 points) and Vitória (Record - 6 points), had a good performance. This represents that 6.534 million viewers watched this chapter in Greater São Paulo. Compared to the two predecessors, the debut index surpassed Império (32 points) and tied with Em Família (33 points).

In the second chapter, recorded 29.8 (30) points, down 9%. Fell short of its predecessor, Império (35 points), but overcame Em Família (29 points). In the third and fourth chapter, the ratings continued to fall, registering 29 points. In the same period, SBT, with a rerun of Carrossel, had a great performance, registering 12.5 and 12.6 respectively.

Controversy

The gay kiss between actresses Fernanda Montenegro and Nathalia Timberg was received controversially. Although the telenovela has received numerous accolades for breaking this "taboo", some media outlets pointed that Gilberto Braga, main author of Babilônia, "does not care about the Brazilian family values." After this scene, Babilônia suffered several boycotts by the conservative public, in general, Evangelicals Protestants. Religious leaders publicly criticized the Rede Globo, and invited his followers not to watch the telenovela. The Evangelical Parliamentary Front, headed by João Campos (PSDB), has released a note of repudiation against the scene on March 19, 2015.

However, Ricardo Linhares, one of the authors, repudiated the criticism, saying: "We live in a secular and democratic country where everyone has the freedom to express your opinion. Who wants to be respected have to respect his fellow man."

After the boycott announcement, some fans reacted and launched a campaign in support of the novela.

Due to the controversy, the main competitor of Globo in timeslot, SBT launched on March 21, 2015, a provocative slogan to promote repeat of Chiquititas. The phrase "Novela for family is here!" was used in several advertisements. Although it is an advertising campaign, the station was criticized, mainly because it is, ironically, the first television station in Brazil to showing a gay kiss.

Upon learning of the boycott, Fernanda Montenegro was surprised. In an interview to Veja magazine, said it is all "very radicalized". "It's a witch hunt!" concluded.

Soundtrack

Volume 1

Volume 2

References

External links 
  

Babilônia (TV series)
2015 telenovelas
Brazilian telenovelas
TV Globo telenovelas
2015 Brazilian television series debuts
2015 Brazilian television series endings
Brazilian LGBT-related television shows
Telenovelas by Gilberto Braga
Television shows set in Rio de Janeiro (city)
Portuguese-language telenovelas